Municipal Okrug 78 is a municipal okrug of Tsentralny District of the federal city of  St. Petersburg, Russia. Population:  

The okrug borders Nevsky Avenue in the northeast, the Fontanka River in the south, and Gorokhovaya Street in the west.

Places of interest include the Kazan Cathedral, the Merchant Court, the Apraksin Dvor, the Alexandrinsky Theatre, and the Saint Petersburg City Duma.

References